Albertus Stephanus  Smith (born 11 June 1993), known professionally as Kwagga Smith, is a South African rugby union player for the South Africa national team, the  in Super Rugby and Shizuoka Blue Revs in the Japanese Japan Rugby League One. His regular position is flanker.

He was a member of the South African Sevens team that won a bronze medal at the 2016 Summer Olympics and of the South African team that won the 2019 Rugby World Cup.

Rugby career

Youth

He played school rugby for HTS Middelburg in Mpumalanga, which led to his inclusion in the  U18 squads that played at the Craven Week competitions in 2010 and 2011.

He started in nine matches for the  side during the 2012 Under-19 Provincial Championship, scoring four tries.

He was selected in the South African U20 side that played at the 2013 IRB Junior World Championship in France. His only appearance in the pool stages came when he came played off the bench in the 97–0 victory over the United States. He didn't play in their matches against England and France, but he did return to the bench for their semi-final clash with Wales. He came on in the first half and scored one of South Africa's two tries in the match, but it wasn't enough to prevent them losing the match 18–17 as Wales progressed to the final. Smith was again named in their final match of the tournament, the third-placed play-off against New Zealand, and once again scored a try for the Baby Boks to help the team to a 41–34 victory and to clinch third place in the competition.

He returned to domestic action later in 2013, making ten appearances for the  side in the 2013 Under-21 Provincial Championship, scoring four tries in the process. He also played for the same team in the 2014 Under-21 Provincial Championship.

Sevens

At the end of 2013, Smith joined the South African Sevens side. He made his debut on the international IRB Sevens World Series circuit at the 2013 South Africa Sevens event, helping his side to victory in their home tournament for just the second time ever, beating New Zealand in the Cup final. He appeared in six legs of the 2013–14 IRB Sevens World Series, following up the event in South Africa with appearances in the United States, Hong Kong, Japan, Scotland and London legs of the tournament.

He was selected in the squad that played at the 2014 Commonwealth Games and helped his side to a 17–12 victory over a New Zealand that won the previous four consecutive tournaments.

Golden Lions

2016 Summer Olympics

Smith was included in a 12-man squad for the 2016 Summer Olympics in Rio de Janeiro. He was named in the starting line-up for their first match in Group B of the competition against Spain, with South Africa winning the match 24–0.

Yamaha Júbilo

In July 2018, Smith joined Japanese side Yamaha Júbilo for the 2018–19 Top League season.

South Africa
Smith was named in the South Africa squad for the 2019 Rugby World Cup. Smith played two matches, against Namibia and Canada in the pool stage, starting both at openside flanker. South Africa went on to win the tournament, defeating England in the final.

In 2021, Smith was part of the South Africa squad for the tests against the British and Irish Lions and Georgia. In the sole game vs Georgia, he scored his 1st test try, playing as 8th man. He went on to feature for the rest of 2021, including the 2021 Rugby Championship and 2021 Autumn Nations Series, predominantly at the blindside flank and also Number 8.

References

External links 
 
 

South African rugby union players
Living people
1993 births
People from Lydenburg
Rugby union flankers
Golden Lions players
South African people of British descent
South Africa international rugby sevens players
South Africa Under-20 international rugby union players
Rugby sevens players at the 2014 Commonwealth Games
Commonwealth Games gold medallists for South Africa
Commonwealth Games rugby sevens players of South Africa
Rugby sevens players at the 2016 Summer Olympics
Olympic rugby sevens players of South Africa
Olympic bronze medalists for South Africa
Olympic medalists in rugby sevens
Medalists at the 2016 Summer Olympics
Commonwealth Games medallists in rugby sevens
South Africa international rugby union players
White South African people
Lions (United Rugby Championship) players
Shizuoka Blue Revs players
Rugby union players from Mpumalanga
Medallists at the 2014 Commonwealth Games